Nina Munk (born 1967) is a Canadian-American journalist and non-fiction author. She is a contributing editor at Vanity Fair, and the author or co-author of four books, including The Idealist: Jeffrey Sachs and the Quest to End Poverty and Fools Rush In: Jerry Levin, Steve Case, and the Unmaking of Time Warner. As well, she is the editor of the critical English translation of How It Happened: Documenting the Tragedy of Hungarian Jewry, an influential account of the Holocaust in Hungary written by Erno Munkacsi in 1947. According to Publishers Marketplace, Munk is working on a new book for Alfred A. Knopf titled In My Dreams, We Are Together about "her family in Hungary during the Holocaust".

Background 

Munk was born in Canada to the entrepreneur and philanthropist Peter Munk and University of Toronto professor Linda Munk. She spent her childhood in Switzerland's Berner Oberland before moving to Toronto for high school. She received a B.A. in comparative literature from Smith College in 1988, an M.A. in French literature and language from Middlebury College in 1989, and, in 1992, an M.S. with honors from Columbia University Graduate School of Journalism where she was awarded the Philip Greer Memorial Scholarship for outstanding business and financial journalism. Munk is married to the artist Peter Soriano, with whom she owns a townhouse in New York City.

Career 

Munk was the 2020-2021 John and Constance Birkelund Fellow at the New York Public Library's Cullman Center for Scholars and Writers, where she worked on "a book of narrative nonfiction set against the backdrop of the Holocaust in Hungary." The book has since been purchased by Alfred A. Knopf in the U.S. and Faber and Faber in the U.K.

Munk's work has appeared in Vanity Fair, The Atlantic, The New York Times, The New York Times Magazine, The New Yorker, Forbes, and Fortune. Before joining Vanity Fair as a contributing editor, she was a senior writer at Fortune and a senior editor at Forbes. Among other honors, she has won three Business Journalist of the Year Awards and three Front Page Awards. Her article "Rich Harvard, Poor Harvard", published in Vanity Fair, was nominated for a Gerald Loeb Award and was included in two published collections, The Great Hangover: 21 Tales of the New Recession from the Pages of Vanity Fair and Schools for Scandal: The Inside Dramas at 16 of America's Most Elite Campuses.

Munk's 2013 book The Idealist: Jeffrey Sachs and the Quest to End Poverty received a great deal of attention for its critical exploration of our "well-intentioned but ultimately naive theories about ending poverty in Africa," to quote Publishers Weekly. Even before it was published, the book was the subject of Joe Nocera's New York Times column in which he noted that Munk's reporting "caused her to become disillusioned, and humbled, by the difficulties that any Western aid effort is likely to encounter."

The Idealist has been named a finalist for the National Business Book Award and the 2013 Governor General's Awards, and longlisted for the Lionel Gelber Prize. It was selected as a "Book of the Year" by The Spectator, Forbes, Bloomberg, and Amazon.ca, and has received overwhelmingly positive reviews. In his review, Bill Gates remarks: "I've told everyone at our foundation that I think it is worth taking the time to read it. It's a valuableand, at times, heartbreakingcautionary tale." Foreign Policy magazine recognized The Idealist with a 2013 Albie Award, remarking: "Writing accessibly about development economics is a high-wire act, but Munk accomplishes it brilliantly." In the Wall Street Journal, James Traub refers to Munk's "impressive persistence, unflagging empathy and journalistic derring-do", citing the depth of her on-the-ground reporting in rural Africa. The economist William Easterly, reviewing the book for Barron's, calls it "one of the most readable and evocative accounts of foreign aid ever written," while Howard W. French describes The Idealist as "a devastating portrait of hubris and its consequences." However, some reviewers, while complimenting Munk's "lively and at times, quite funny book," have argued that her portrayal of Sachs is overly critical—she is, to quote Erika Fry's review in Fortune, "a bit hard on Sachs." Sachs himself has reportedly been dismissive of the book. On his WNYC radio show, Brian Lehrer suggests that Ms. Munk is overreaching when she concludes that foreign aid has been more harmful than good.

Munk's book about the merger of AOL and Time Warner, Fools Rush In: Jerry Levin, Steve Case, and the Unmaking of AOL Time Warner, was published by HarperCollins in 2004, one of several books that year about the ill-fated business deal. The New York Times Review of Books called it "the best [book] so far" on the subject of AOL Time Warner, noting Munk's "exemplary reporting" and "lively, lucid writing." The book continues to be cited as "a cautionary tale on New Media’s last revolution," to quote MSNBC's Joe Scarborough. David Carr wrote: "Of all the journalists who wrote obits for the dot-com mania, few did it with the precision and quiet glee of Nina Munk."

In 2008, Munk co-wrote The Art of Clairtone: The Making of Design Icon, a coffee-table book about the celebrated Canadian stereo manufacturer Clairtone Sound Corporation, a company co-founded by her father in 1958. Archival photographs, documents, and artifacts gathered for and used in The Art of Clairtone were displayed in an exhibition about Clairtone at the Design Exchange museum in 2008.

As a sideline to her journalism career, Munk founded UrbanHound.com, a website for dog owners, in 2000. The website led to two spin-off books: Urbanhound: The New York City Dog's Ultimate Survival Guide, co-authored by Munk in 2001; and The Complete Healthy Dog Handbook, written by veterinarian Betsy Brevitz in 2009. But while Urbanhound.com was a critical success, Munk conceded to the New York Times that it never made much money. In November 2009, FetchDog, an e-commerce and catalog company based in Maine, acquired UrbanHound.com from Munk for an undisclosed sum.

Selected bibliography

Articles
Africa Rising: Harvard? Yale? Princeton? “A nonprofit program is recruiting Kenya's top high-school students and connecting them with America's most competitive universities” Air Mail, 2020-10-17
“A First-Hand Look at Atrocity, by a ‘Privileged” Eye-Witness” The Toronto Star, 2018-12-02
"How Warren Buffett's Son Would Feed the World" The Atlantic, 2016-05-01
"The Met's Grand Gamble" "Vanity Fair, 2010-05-01
"Rich Harvard, Poor Harvard" Vanity Fair, 2009-08-01
"Jeffrey Sachs's $200 Billion Dream", Vanity Fair, 2007-07-01
"Greenwich's Outrageous Fortunes", Vanity Fair, 2006-07-01
"Steve Case's New Act", The New York Times, 2005-07-12
"Steve Wynn's Biggest Gamble", Vanity Fair, 2005-06-01
"Gunslingers No More", The New York Times, 2005-05-22
"The Taking of Time Warner" Vanity Fair, 2004-01-01

Books
 How It Happened: Documenting the Tragedy of Hungarian Jewry. (McGill-Queen's University Press, 2018. )The Idealist: Jeffrey Sachs and the Quest to End Poverty. (Doubleday, 2013. )Fools Rush In: Jerry Levin, Steve Case, and the Unmaking of AOL Time Warner. (HarperCollins, 2004. )The Art of Clairtone: The Making of Design Icon, 1958-1971. (McClelland & Stewart, 2008. )The Great Hangover: 21 Tales of the New Recession from the Pages of Vanity Fair Magazine. (Harper Perennial, 2010. )

 References 

 External links 
Vanity Fair bio
Personal website
"Nina Munk on Poverty, Development, and the Idealist", a one-hour interview on the EconTalk podcast hosted by Russ Roberts
"The Quest to End Poverty: Nina Munk" on CBC Radio's The Current"A Conversation with Author Nina Munk" on Charlie Rose''
"Nina Munk speaks at Central European University, Budapest"
"Nina Munk Reads from The Great Hangover" at VF.com

1967 births
Canadian women journalists
Canadian non-fiction writers
American women journalists
American non-fiction writers
Journalists from Toronto
Living people
Smith College alumni
Middlebury College alumni
Columbia University Graduate School of Journalism alumni
Canadian expatriate writers in the United States
Writers from Toronto
Canadian women non-fiction writers
21st-century American women
Vanity Fair (magazine) people
Canadian people of Hungarian-Jewish descent